Alpha-tocopherol transfer protein is a protein that in humans is encoded by the TTPA gene.

See also
 Familial isolated vitamin E deficiency

References

Further reading

External links
 GeneReviews/NCBI/NIH/UW entry on Ataxia with Vitamin E Deficiency
  OMIM entries on Ataxia with Vitamin E Deficiency